The Howrah–Mumbai CSMT Weekly Express is a passenger train service in India.

Service
This train connects two metro cities of India – Mumbai and Kolkata. It is numbered as 12869/12870. It runs weekly. It departs from Howrah every Friday 02:35 PM and reach Mumbai CST every Sunday at 11:00 PM. On the reverse direction, it departs Mumbai CST every Sunday 11:05 AM to reach Howrah every Monday 07:30 PM.

Coach composition

The trains use modern LHB coach consisting of 2 AC two-tier coaches (2A), 5 AC three-tier coaches (3A), 3 AC three-tier economy coaches (M), 7 sleeper class coaches, 1 AC hot buffet car (pantry car), 2 general unreserved coaches, 1 divyangjan cum guard coach (SLRD), and 1 generator car.

Currently, it is also running with one high capacity parcel van.

Rake composition

Traction
It is hauled by a -based WAP-7 locomotive end to end.

References

External links
 12870/Howrah–Mumbai CST Weekly SF Express India Rail Info

Rail transport in Howrah
Transport in Mumbai
Rail transport in West Bengal
Express trains in India
Rail transport in Maharashtra
Rail transport in Odisha
Rail transport in Chhattisgarh
Rail transport in Jharkhand
Railway services introduced in 2006